Gymnoscelis melaninfra is a moth in the family Geometridae. It was described by Hiroshi Inoue in 1994. It is endemic to Japan.

References

Moths described in 1994
melaninfra
Moths of Japan
Endemic fauna of Japan
Taxa named by Hiroshi Inoue